Nathaniel Dean is an Australian actor and voiceover artist. His most recent performances include Sergeant Hallett in Ridley Scott's Alien: Covenant, as well as colonial Australian settler William Thornhill in The Secret River for the Sydney Theatre Company.

In 2002, he won an AACTA Award for Best Supporting Actor for his role in Tony Ayres’ acclaimed Walking on Water.

Dean has performed in numerous stage plays, TV series, short films and Australian feature films. He has been the voice of numerous advertising campaigns and productions including Recipe to Riches, the AFL, Victoria Bitter and Holden.

Early life
Dean grew up in the Yarra Valley region of Victoria. During his final year of high school, he resuscitated a woman at his local swimming pool. This event would later become the subject of Dean’s first dramatic work.

After performing in numerous productions in Melbourne’s independent theatre scene Dean auditioned for the National Institute of Dramatic Art. He was accepted with a scholarship.

Career 
After graduation, Dean and NIDA classmate Toby Schmitz worked together on Howard Korder’s Boys Life. The production was selected to open the Sydney Fringe Festival.
The pair appeared together soon after in Schmitz’s first play, Dream a Little Dream at Belvoir St Theatre.

In 2002, Dean played Patch in the TV series Always Greener, which was nominated for an International Emmy Award. That same year, he received an AFI Awards award for Best Supporting Actor for his role in Tony Ayres’ film Walking on Water. In 2004, Dean was nominated for the same award for his role in Cate Shortland’s Somersault. He also played Jothee in Brian Henson’s science fiction film Farscape: The Peacekeeper Wars.

Dean played alongside Heath Ledger in Candy - Neil Armfield’s adaptation of Luke Davies’ novel by the same name. Armfield would later direct Dean in the plays Peribanez and Tommy Murphy’s Gwen in Purgatory at Belvoir St Theatre and later The Secret River at the Sydney Theatre Company.

In 2008 Dean played a Rugby League star in Matt Nable’s Australian film, The Final Winter, which told the story of how big business entered the NRL during the 1980s.

That same year, Dean played Fred Klein in Rain Shadow, a desperate and suicidal farmer whose livelihood is threatened by drought. Dean then played a psychotic serial killer addicted to Crystal Methamphetamine on East West 101.

Dean went on to play Sergeant Mick Scanlon in Channel Seven’s period drama Wild Boys and Kraut in Channel Ten’s "Bikie Wars". He also appeared in the AFI winning series Puberty Blues.

More recently, Dean has spent more time on stage, starring in Belvoir St Theatre’s production of "Gwen in Purgatory", written by Tommy Murphy, and directed by Neil Armfield.

In 2013, he starred as William Thornhill in the Sydney Theatre Company’s landmark adaptation of Kate Grenville’s book, The Secret River.

Dean plays Tyson Black in the crime-thriller film Locusts.

Filmography

Film

Television

References

External links

 

Australian male television actors
Living people
National Institute of Dramatic Art alumni
Male actors from Victoria (Australia)
Australian male stage actors
Australian male film actors
Best Supporting Actor AACTA Award winners
Year of birth missing (living people)